Poliquin is a surname. Notable people with the surname include:

Bruce Poliquin (born 1953), American businessman and politician
Charles Poliquin (born 1961), Canadian strength coach and fitness author
Daniel Poliquin (born 1953), Canadian novelist and translator
John Poliquin (born 1986), Canadian film director
Laurent Poliquin (born 1975), Canadian poet